Juan Argüello (born 8 March 1947) is a Nicaraguan sprinter. He competed in the men's 100 metres at the 1968 Summer Olympics.

References

1947 births
Living people
Athletes (track and field) at the 1968 Summer Olympics
Nicaraguan male sprinters
Olympic athletes of Nicaragua
Sportspeople from Managua